This is a list of properties and districts in Pike County, Georgia that are listed on the National Register of Historic Places (NRHP).

Current listings

|}

See also
National Register of Historic Places listings in Georgia
List of National Historic Landmarks in Georgia (U.S. state)

References

Pike
Buildings and structures in Pike County, Georgia